The Best British Forward award is an annual British ice hockey award made to the best British forward as voted for by members of Ice Hockey Journalists UK.

The award was first made in 2003 and has since been won five times by Tony Hand and twice by Ashley Tait.

Past winners

See also
Man of Ice Awards

References

British ice hockey trophies and awards
Ice hockey players in the United Kingdom
Awards established in 2003
Annual events in the United Kingdom
2003 establishments in the United Kingdom
Ice Hockey Journalists UK